Steve O'Brien (born 20 June 1965) is an Australian former professional rugby league footballer who played for the Canterbury-Bankstown Bulldogs and the Balmain Tigers in the NSWRL competition in the 1980s and 1990s.

Early life
O'Brien played his junior rugby league for the Moorebank Rams and Liverpool City.

Playing career
O'Brien made his first grade debut in the 1984 season against South Sydney and played on the wing in Canterbury's 6-4 victory over Parramatta in the 1984 grand final.  O'Brien was not a part of Canterbury's 1985 premiership winning team but played in the 1986 4-2 loss to Parramatta in a tryless grand final.  In 1988, O'Brien played in two finals games for Canterbury but was not included in the victorious grand final side which defeated Balmain.  In 1989, O'Brien joined Balmain and played in the 1989 grand final against the Canberra Raiders which is regarded as one of the best grand finals of all time.  O'Brien retired at the end of the 1992 season.

References

1965 births
Living people
Australian rugby league players
Balmain Tigers players
Rugby league wingers
Canterbury-Bankstown Bulldogs players
Rugby league players from Sydney